The Prior of Ardchattan (later Commendator of Ardchattan) was the head of the Valliscaulian, and then Cistercian, monastic community of Ardchattan Priory, Argyll. It was founded in 1230 by Duncan MacDougal, Lord of Argyll. In April 1510 it was incorporated as a cell of Beauly Priory. It was annexed to the bishopric of the Isles in 1615. The following are a list of abbots and commendators:

List of priors

 Peter, 1296
 Martin Filani, 1371-1395
 Maurice, 1395 x 1425
 Patrick, 1425
 Duncan MacDougall, 1489
 Dugall MacDougall, 1491
 Eugenius MacDougall, 1500
 Duncan Macarthur, 1508-1544
 John Campbell, 1538-1544

List of commendators

 Neil Campbell, 1544
 John Campbell (again), 1545–1580 "In 1558 John Campbell became Prior of Ardchattan, he was succeeded by his son Alexander in 1580, but during these troubled years of religious dissension the number of monks dwindled and the Priory become a private dwelling house."
 Alexander Campbell, 1580–1602

Notes

Bibliography
 Cowan, Ian B. & Easson, David E., Medieval Religious Houses: Scotland With an Appendix on the Houses in the Isle of Man, Second Edition, (London, 1976), p. 83
 Watt, D.E.R. & Shead, N.F. (eds.), The Heads of Religious Houses in Scotland from the 12th to the 16th Centuries, The Scottish Records Society, New Series, Volume 24, (Edinburgh, 2001), pp. 10–1

See also
 Ardchattan Priory

History of Argyll and Bute
People associated with Highland (council area)
Ardchattan
Ardchattan